Power History refers to the power of a nuclear reactor over an extended period of time.  Power history is important for calculations and operations that involve decay heat and fission product poisons and to avoid the iodine pit during reactor shutdowns.

For example, a nuclear reactor that has operated at 100% power for 100 hours and then has dropped down to 20% power for 5 hours will have a different amount of decay heat and fission product poisons than the same nuclear reactor operating at 20% power for 105 hours.  This is because the second reactor has a different power history.

Nuclear technology